Charles Gibson is an American visual effects supervisor.

Personal life
Gibson is the son of character actor Henry Gibson.

Filmography
Flight of the Intruder (1991)
Babe (1995)
The Green Mile (1999)
Cats & Dogs (2001)
The Ring (2002)
Pirates of the Caribbean: The Curse of the Black Pearl (2003)
The Terminal (2004)
Pirates of the Caribbean: Dead Man's Chest (2006)
Pirates of the Caribbean: At World's End (2007)
Terminator Salvation (2009)
Pirates of the Caribbean: On Stranger Tides (2011)
The Hunger Games: Mockingjay - Part 1 (2014)
The Hunger Games: Mockingjay - Part 2 (2015)
Aquaman (2018)

Oscar awards
All of these are in the category of Best Visual Effects.

68th Academy Awards-Babe. Award shared with Scott E. Anderson, John Cox and Neal Scanlan. Won.
76th Academy Awards-Nominated for Pirates of the Caribbean: The Curse of the Black Pearl. Nomination shared with Terry Frazee, Hal Hickel and John Knoll. Lost to The Lord of the Rings: The Return of the King.
79th Academy Awards-Pirates of the Caribbean: Dead Man's Chest, shared with Allen Hall, Hal Hickel and John Knoll. Won.
80th Academy Awards-Nominated for Pirates of the Caribbean: At World's End. Nomination shared with John Frazier, Hal Hickel and John Knoll. Lost to The Golden Compass.

References

External links

Living people
Year of birth missing (living people)
Best Visual Effects Academy Award winners
Best Visual Effects BAFTA Award winners
Place of birth missing (living people)
Special effects people